The 1976 All-Ireland Senior Camogie Championship was the high point of the 1976 camogie season in Ireland. The championship was won by Killkenny who defeated Dublin by a one-point margin in the lowest scoring final for 34 years. The match drew an attendance of 6,000. It was the first time that two counties from the same province met in the final of the All-Ireland championship.

Open Draw
Champions Wexford made their exit to Dublin at the first hurdle, trailing four goals to two at half time and losing to a Dublin team that did not score a single point but had two goal each from Fleming and McManus and one each from Byrne and Sutton. Galway’s Therese Duane pointed a late free and goalkeeper Margaret Killeen saved a great shot in the last minute to secure victory over Tipperary. Clare had the better of exchanges and an early goal from Eleece Fitzgibbon against Kilkenny in their quarter-final before succumbing to Kilkenny by seven points, Ann Carroll and Angela Downey scoring Kilkenny’s goals.

Final
The ability to get greater distance into their deliveries out of attack or from the middle of the field was the main difference between the teams in a low scoring final. Dublin got the inspiration of good starts to both haves but Kilkenny played as though they knew they had the measure of their opponents. The scoring started with two Dublin points (Mary Mernagh), before a pointed free from Helena O'Neill,  Dublin started the second half with a goal from Maura Sutton from a Mary Mernagh cross 40 seconds into the second half but it was their last score of the match. Kilkenny equalised 17 minutes into the second half with a long range free from Helena O'Neill and Helena then shot the winning point nine minutes from time. They shot nine wides in the second half.  Pádraig Puirséil wrote in the Irish Press:
Not for the first time, the All-Ireland and trophy have gone to Kilkenny because of the accuracy from frees of Helena O'Neill. The final provided a sharp contrast in styles, Dublin relying almost entirely on team-work, ground-play and speed to offset the far greater individual skills of the Kilkenny girls. We rarely saw the brilliant passages of play which have characterised other finals in which Kilkenny were engaged, but the close scoring and end-to-end exchanges ensured that excitement and interest were sustained form start to stop with never more than two points between the teams. A well worked goal, finished from a seemingly impossible angle by Maura Sutton sent Dublin two points clear 40 seconds into the second half, and only a wonderful save by Teresa O'Neill prevented them from going further ahead. But Kilkenny, the breeze freshening behind them, got timely impetus when Helena O'Neill pointed a free form 60 yards out.
John D Hickey wrote in the Irish Independent: It was never less than a rousing struggle which gave Kilkenny their second title. Damp conditions did not inspire a high scoring rate but there were some excellent chances missed especially by Kilkenny forwards – they had nine second half wides against one for Dublin – and the losers missed out on at least two gilt edged chances for the equalizer in the closing five minutes. Kilkenny's power lay in a powerful midfield trio of Helena O'Neill, Peggy Carey and captain Mary Fennelly which pushed the winners into almost sustained attack. Their tally, however, was not enhanced by a series of wides often brought about when the ball was not distributed to better placed players. Then there were the saves effected by Sheila Murray in the Dublin goal, leaving Dublin with a chance right up to the final whistle. Perhaps Sheila Murray's best save was from Carmel Doyle just after Kilkenny had drawn level 12 minutes into the second half.

Kilkenny also won the 1976 Leinster title against the same opponents in much the same way.

Final stages

MATCH RULES
50 minutes
Replay if scores level
Maximum of 3 substitutions

See also
 All-Ireland Senior Hurling Championship
 :Category:Camogie players
 National Camogie League
 Camogie All Stars Awards
 Ashbourne Cup

References

External links
 Camogie Association
 All-Ireland Senior Camogie Championship: Roll of Honour
 Camogie on Facebook
 Camogie on GAA Oral History Project

All-Ireland Senior Camogie Championship
1976
All-Ireland Senior Camogie Championship
All-Ireland Senior Camogie Championship
All-Ireland Senior Camogie Championship